Hemimarginula is a genus of sea snails, marine gastropod mollusks in the family Fissurellidae, the keyhole limpets and slit limpets.

Species
Species within the genus Hemimarginula include:
 Hemimarginula biangulata (Sowerby, 1901)
 Hemimarginula dentigera (Heilprin, 1889)
 Hemimarginula hemitoma Simone & Cunha, 2014 
 Hemimarginula modesta (Adams, 1872)
 Hemimarginula pileum (Heilprin, 1889)
 Hemimarginula pumila (Adams, 1852)
 Hemimarginula simpla (Christiaens, 1987)
 Hemimarginula subrugosa (Thiele, 1916)

References

 McLean J.H. (2011) Reinstatement of the fissurellid subfamily Hemitominae, with the description of new genera, and proposed evolutionary lineage, based on morphological characters of shell and radula (Gastropoda: Vetigastropoda). Malacologia 54(1-2): 407-427. page(s): 412

External links
 To World Register of Marine Species

Fissurellidae